Jon Michael McGraw (born April 2, 1979) is a former American football safety. He was selected by the New York Jets with a second-round pick in the 2002 NFL Draft out of Kansas State University. He has most recently played with the Kansas City Chiefs and also played with the Detroit Lions.

College career
McGraw played collegiately as a walk-on under head coach Bill Snyder at Kansas State University from 1997-2001.  He was a non-scholarship redshirt his freshman year of 1997.  McGraw became a starter in 2000 after getting action as a back-up in 1999.  In 2000 as a junior, he was a Big 12 Honorable Mention by the AP and coaches.  He led the Wildcats to a Cotton Bowl victory over the Tennessee Volunteers.  2001 would be McGraw's final season, a season that Wildcats struggled to a 6-5 record, after a loss to the Syracuse Orangemen in the 2001 Insight.com Bowl.

Professional career

McGraw was drafted in the second round, 57th overall by the New York Jets in the 2002 NFL Draft. Prior to the start of the 2005 season, McGraw was traded by the Jets to the Detroit Lions for a 7th round draft choice in the 2006 NFL Draft.

Kansas City Chiefs
On March 29, 2007, McGraw signed a two-year contract with the Kansas City Chiefs. On September 13, 2009, McGraw scored his first touchdown after blocking a punt against the Baltimore Ravens. McGraw also had an interception when the ball was tipped in the air and he caught in the endzone for a touchback. This would also lead to a 39-yard Hail Mary touchdown from Tyler Palko to Dexter McCluster. In 2011, his final year in the NFL, McGraw was awarded the Chief's Ed Block Courage Award, an award voted by his teammates for role models of inspiration, sportsmanship, and courage.

NFL statistics

References

External links
Official Website of Jon McGraw
Kansas City Chiefs bio

1979 births
Living people
Sportspeople from Manhattan, Kansas
American football safeties
Kansas State Wildcats football players
New York Jets players
Detroit Lions players
Kansas City Chiefs players
Ed Block Courage Award recipients